Cabaret of Souls is an album released by Richard Thompson on 10 October 2012 on Beeswing Records. It was recorded at Bruce Ryan Soundstage at Idyllwild Arts Academy Idyllwild in May 2011.

Overview
This album grew out of a small project that was planned for 2009 convention of the International Society of Bassists.

The society wished to honour Thompson's friend and frequent collaborator Danny Thompson, and commissioned Richard Thompson to write a piece to be performed at the convention and which would highlight Danny Thompson's skills. What Richard Thompson eventually delivered was a collection of thematically linked songs with narration in between the songs.

The theme is a "talent contest" in the afterlife between the souls of recently deceased people. Each soul sings a song revealing key elements of their lives, including a crucial sin or vanity. After each performance by a soul the Keeper Of Souls and his assistants sing or speak in reply.

After the initial performance at State College, Pennsylvania, the suite was performed intermittently in 2010 before Richard Thompson decided to record it in the studio in 2011. Danny Thompson was not available for these sessions, so David Piltch took the bass playing role.

The album was not made available in retail stores. It could be ordered from Thompson's own on-line store or purchased at live shows.

A handful of shows at the Santa Monica Performing Arts Center supported the album release.

Track listing

All songs written by Richard Thompson:

"Prelude"
"Overture"
"Song Of The Keepers"
"Whipping On"
"The Linnett"
"I Really Do Love A Waltz"
"I Must Lie Down"
"Gluttony Considered"
"Clive Smythe"
"The Critic Critiqued"
"I Get Younger"
"The Parchment Grows Thin"
"Auldie Riggs"
"Auldie Riggs' Dance"
"Mr. Riggs Appreciated"
"Her Eyes not Mine"
"From The Inside Out"
"Breaking Down The Walls"
"Will You Wash Away The Blood"
"My Dave"
"The Gangster's Moll"
"Run Judas Run"
"It Came With A Whisper"
"I Want The World"
"She Had It All"
"Bosom Of The Lord"
"Hot Place For Hypocrites"
"One More Breath"
"The Keeper Regrets And Reflects"
"Whipping Off"

Personnel

 Musical

 Richard Thompson - vocals, acoustic guitar
 Pete Zorn - flute, saxophone, vocals
 Debra Dobkin - Percussion, vocals
 David Piltch - Double Bass
 Judith Owen - Vocals
 Harry Shearer - Vocals, narration
 Peter Askim - Conductor
 The Idyllwild Arts Academy Orchestra

 Technical

 Simon Tassano - editing and mixing (at Rumiville Studio, Austin, Texas)
 Matthew Neth - recording engineer
 Jason Cropper - assistant engineer

References

2012 albums
Richard Thompson (musician) albums
Self-released albums